The Social Democratic Party of Bosnia and Herzegovina (Bosnian: Socijaldemokratska partija Bosne i Hercegovine (SDP BiH) / Социјалдемократска партија Босне и Херцеговине), also simply known as the Social Democratic Party (Socijaldemokratska partija (SDP) / Социјалдемократска партија) is a social-democratic political party in Bosnia and Herzegovina.

It is officially multi-ethnic, but gathers most support from Bosniaks.

History

Origin

The SDP BiH has its roots in the Social Democratic Party of Bosnia and Herzegovina, founded in 1909. The party was founded by workers to defend and represent their rights and interests, and consisted of members of all ethnic groups. On 20 April 1920, the Social Democratic Party became part of the League of Communists of Yugoslavia.

The SDP BiH was reestablished on 27 December 1992. The party was enlarged by the inclusion of the Social Democrats of BiH party to the original SDP.

Timeline
At the first post-war election in Bosnia and Herzegovina in 1996, the SDP BiH appeared in a coalition with five other parties within the "Joint List". Candidates for the Bosniak and Croat members of the Presidency, Sead Avdić and Ivo Komšić, were not elected.

On 6 April 1997, Zlatko Lagumdžija was elected as the SDP BiH's new president. At the 2000 parliamentary election, the SDP BiH won the most seats in the House of Representatives. On 22 February 2001, Božidar Matić was appointed Chairman of the Council of Ministers. 

At the 2006 general election, Željko Komšić was elected Croat member of the Presidency. He was re-elected at the 2010 general election.

On 7 December 2014, Nermin Nikšić was elected president of the party, succeeding Lagumdžija. On the eve of the 2020 municipal elections, the SDP BiH entered into a three-party liberal coalition with the parties People and Justice (NiP) and Our Party (NS).

The coalition, also supported by the Union for a Better Future and the People's European Union, announced Denis Bećirović's candidacy in the Bosnian general election on 21 May 2022, running for Presidency member and representing the Bosniaks. At the general election, held on 2 October 2022, Bećirović was elected to the Presidency, having obtained 57.37% of the vote. Following the election, the SDP BiH reached an agreement on the formation of a new government supported by the coalition of the Alliance of Independent Social Democrats, the Croatian Democratic Union, NiP, NS and the Democratic People's Alliance.

Ideology
The Social Democratic Party is a left-wing democratic party. The program vision corresponds to values ​​and ideas of social democracy in Europe and the world. The SDP BiH is a civic party that is particularly interested in improving the social status of workers, rural population, students, youth, veterans, women, pensioners and citizens of Bosnia and Herzegovina in the diaspora.

List of presidents

Elections

Parliamentary elections

Presidency elections

Cantonal elections

References

Sources
SDP sada broji 40.000 članova, svakog mjeseca broj se poveća za 464 člana at sdp.ba

External links
Official website

1992 establishments in Bosnia and Herzegovina
Full member parties of the Socialist International
Parties related to the Party of European Socialists
Political parties established in 1992
Pro-European political parties in Bosnia and Herzegovina
Secularism in Bosnia and Herzegovina
Social democratic parties in Europe
Social democratic parties in Bosnia and Herzegovina